Judy Matheson (27 August 1945) is a British actress notable for her appearances in several horror films in the 1970s. She also appeared in many other films and television series.

Career 
After drama school, Matheson began her career in 1967 with the Bristol Old Vic Theatre Company with which she toured the United States, including a season on Broadway, and Canada, followed by Europe and Israel, in three of Shakespeare's plays, the highlight of which was Sir Tyrone Guthrie's production of Measure for Measure. 
 
In 1967, Matheson signed with the prestigious talent agency Hazel Malone Management. Her debut film The Chairman (The Most Dangerous Man in the World), starred Gregory Peck. She was chosen to star in the Spanish film The Exquisite Cadaver (Las Crueles) with Capucine, directed by Vicente Aranda, in 1969, which was showcased as the Spanish entry at the San Sebastian Film Festival. In 1971 she starred opposite Freddie Jones in Charles Wood's experimental drama The Emergence of Anthony Purdy esq. directed by Patrick Dromgoole for Harlech Television. It was chosen that year as ITV's entry in the Monte Carlo TV Festival.In the 1970s, she appeared in the Hammer Horror films Lust for a Vampire and Twins of Evil. Her other films include Pete Walker's The Flesh and Blood Show, The House That Vanished (AKA Scream and Die) directed by Jose Larraz, Crucible of Terror, Confessions of a Window Cleaner, and Percy's Progress.
 
Matheson's television work includes City '68, Spindoe, Coronation Street, Z Cars (twice, leading female), Crossroads, (Hugh Mortimer's secretary and Sandy's girlfriend), Harriet's Back in Town, The Adventurer, Dead of Night, The Professionals, The Sweeney, Shelley (BBC film of the poet, opposite Robert Powell and directed by Alan Bridges), Blake's 7, and Citizen Smith.
 
Matheson's theatre work includes starring opposite Richard O'Sullivan in a British tour of the comedy Boeing-Boeing with Yootha Joyce, Sally Thomsett and Doug Fisher, Ray Cooney's Chase Me Comrade, Stage Struck by Simon Gray, Hugh and Margaret Williams’ The Flip Side, Funny Peculiar by Mike Stott, and Alan Ayckbourn's Bedroom Farce. In 1979, she undertook a season playing leading parts at the Donovan Maule Theatre in Nairobi, Kenya.

When Matheson returned to London, she was invited to train as a continuity announcer for the new television franchise for ITV in the South Of England, Television South (TVS). She became a permanent continuity announcer for TVS in 1981. In 1990, she was part of the launch team for British Satellite Broadcasting, later to become BSkyB. She has also worked as a free-lance continuity announcer for Carlton Television and London Weekend Television .

In 1996 Matheson went to live in South Africa, returning to the U.K. in 2003

In 2016, she was the narrator for Encounter, the architecture and design radio series from Monitor Production in Sound. Resonance F.M., the international arts radio station, broadcast all series of the programmes and a live special, with the last series on the air every Sunday and Wednesday during the summer of 2017.

Matheson also often attends film and television conventions and Hammer Film events as a guest. In 2017 Matheson took part, with fellow Hammer actress Caroline Munro, in a short spoof horror film Frankula produced by The Misty Moon Film Society, of which she is an Honorary Patron.

In 2019, she took part in a new documentary about Peter Cushing, ‘Peter Cushing In His Own Words’, talking about her work with him, released by the production company Rabbit & Snail Films. She also contributed to an American documentary about the actress Lynne Frederick: Lynne, the English Rose’ also released in 2019. As part of the 'special features' of the Studiocanal release of the Blu-ray of Hammer Films’ Lust For A Vampire ( released in 2019) she has recorded an interview about her work and in particular her experience of working on that film.

She has returned to the big screen for a cameo in the feature film The Haunting of Margam Castle, starring Derren Nesbitt, Jane Merrow, and Caroline Munro, directed by Andrew Jones for North Bank Entertainment, due for release in 2020. Most recently  Matheson has undertaken the narration for "Mary Millington On Location", part of the special features for the new Mary Millington box set, released by Screenbound Entertainment in 2020.

During lockdown in May 2020 she performed  a monologue (Spy) written by Martin Murphy, recorded for Bruised Sky Productions. In March 2021, also during lockdown, Matheson took part in a live online reading of a new play by David Barry, The Lives of Frankie Abbott, based on an episode in the life of the popular 1970s Please Sir character in old age. Produced by The Misty Moon Film Society, the cast included Felicity Dean, Suzanne Maddock, Graham Cole OBE and David Barry. In July 2021, she took the part of Lady Lloyd George  in an audio recording of a new play by AD Cooper, What Did You Do In The War, Mama, for Towton Productions, directed by Laurel Parker of Mobley Street Productions. It also stars fellow Hammer Films actress Madeline Smith & is due to be released as a podcast on 26/07/2021. Matheson’s return to the big screen continues with an appearance in the feature length documentary Keeping The British End Up, directed by Simon Sheridan, due to be released in May 2022.

In October 2021 she played Sir Tony Robinson’s wife in a short film, Joe’s Journey, the script created from a cartoon by Tony Husband to raise awareness of dementia, directed by Jason Read.

Also in October 2021  Matheson took part in a live public reading of George Bernard Shaw’s Pygmalion at The Actors Church in Covent Garden London, produced by Paul Burton Productions in aid of the charity Acting For Others.

In March 2022, a live reading of The Lives Of Frankie Abbott by David Barry, which had previously been performed on Zoom during lockdown, was performed in front of an audience at The Phoenix Arts Club. The cast included David Barry, Matheson, Felicity Dean, Graham Cole, Suzanne Maddock, and Larry Dann, and it was produced by The Misty Moon Film Society. It was recorded and will be distributed on CD.

Filmography

Film

Television

References

ENCOUNTER RADIO SERIES
The Lives of Frankie Abbott (TV Series 2021– ) - IMDb
The Mary Millington Movie Collection Limited Edition Blu-Ray Box-Set
THE HAUNTING OF MARGAM CASTLE
Preview: London Film Memorabilia Convention Hammer and Horror Film Day, 9th November 2013 | The Dark Side
About
The New York Shakespeare Festival, 1967
Charles Wood – British Television Drama
- YouTube
First guests announced for McM Comic Con / Memorabilia Birmingham

External links

English film actresses
English television actresses
Living people
1945 births